James Hume Walter Miéville Stone (born 16 June 1954) is a Scottish Liberal Democrat politician, representing the constituency of Caithness, Sutherland and Easter Ross, since 2017  the northernmost mainland British constituency and one of the largest by area.

He was a Member of the Scottish Parliament (MSP) for the constituency of Caithness, Sutherland, and Easter Ross. He held the seat from the opening of the Scottish Parliament in 1999, until he stood down in 2011. He served as the Liberal Democrat Spokesperson for Defence from 2019 to 2022 and has served as Spokesperson for Digital, Culture, Media and Sport since September 2020.

Early life and career
Stone went to school at Tain and Gordonstoun. While at school his parents founded Highland Fine Cheeses in 1967. He studied History and Geology at the University of St Andrews and graduated in 1977. Upon graduation, he worked in a variety of fields including fish gutting, on a building site, teaching English on the Italian island of Sicily and the oil industry.

Councillor

Stone was first elected to Ross and Cromarty District Council in 1986, serving until its abolition in 1996. He served as a member of the Highland Council from its creation in 1995 until his election as MSP in 1999.

At the 2012 Local Government Elections, he returned to the Highland Council as councillor for the Tain and Easter Ross Ward.

Scottish Parliament
As an MSP, Stone was the Scottish Liberal Democrat Party spokesperson on Housing and the Deputy Party spokesman on Health. He participated in the UK television programme, University Challenge, as part of the Scottish Parliament's team. He stood down from the Scottish Parliament at the 2011 election.

In 2016, he stood for election at the 2016 Scottish Parliament election, for Caithness, Sutherland and Ross which was largely his former seat after boundary changes were made in 2011. He finished in second place, and was not elected.

House of Commons

Stone was elected as the Member of Parliament for Caithness, Sutherland and Easter Ross at the 2017 general election, defeating the incumbent SNP MP Paul Monaghan by 2,044 votes. On 16 June 2017, he was announced as the Liberal Democrat spokesman for Scotland. On 12 October 2017 he was transferred to the role of Armed Forces spokesman in a reshuffle.

Stone had been re-elected for the Tain and Easter Ross Ward at the 2017 Local Government elections a month earlier. He resigned his seat on Highland Council after he was elected as an MP.

Since his election, Stone has raised various local issues in the House of Commons such as the provision of healthcare facilities in the Scottish Highlands. Stone has also sponsored early day motions to investigate allegations of abuse by G4S on behalf of UK Visas and Immigration and has supported the rollout of free, early years childcare.

During the 2019 general election, Stone campaigned with the Liberal Democrats slogan 'Stop Brexit', saying “This General Election is our best chance to elect a government to stop Brexit". He was re-elected in the 2019 general election with 11,705 votes, but a reduced majority of 204.

Personal life

Stone is married with three children, one son and two daughters, both of whom also attended the University of St Andrews. He is also a keen gardener and an expert on edible fungi.

References

External links 

 
 
 Highland Fine Cheeses
 

1954 births
Living people
Alumni of the University of St Andrews
Scottish Liberal Democrat councillors
Liberal Democrat MSPs
Members of the Scottish Parliament 1999–2003
Members of the Scottish Parliament 2003–2007
Members of the Scottish Parliament 2007–2011
UK MPs 2017–2019
UK MPs 2019–present
Scottish Liberal Democrat MPs
Members of the Parliament of the United Kingdom for Highland constituencies
People educated at Tain Royal Academy
People educated at Gordonstoun